Félix Gonzalo Cortés Jiménez (born 15 March 1989) is a Chilean former football player who played as a defender.

Personal life
He is the younger brother of the former professional footballer Pedro Cortés, who played for both Deportes La Serena and Coquimbo Unido, classic rivals to each other.

References

External links
 
 
 Félix Cortés at Football-Lineups

1989 births
Living people
People from La Serena
Chilean footballers
Deportes La Serena footballers
Naval de Talcahuano footballers
Unión San Felipe footballers
Chilean Primera División players
Primera B de Chile players
Association football central defenders